Elias Manoel Alves de Paula (born 30 November 2001), commonly known as Elias Manoel or Elias, is a Brazilian professional footballer who plays as left-winger or striker for Major League Soccer club New York Red Bulls.

Club career

Gremio
Born in Campinas, Brazil, Elias Manoel began his career in the youth ranks of Guarani. He joined Grêmio's Academy at the age of 16 in 2018. He made his first team debut on 30 March 2021, appearing as a starter in a 2-2 draw with Esporte Clube São Luiz on matchday 8 of the Campeonato Gaúcho. On 19 May 2021, Elias Manoel helped Gremio to a 6-2 victory over Venezuelan side Aragua F.C., scoring his first two goals with the club in a 2021 Copa Sudamericana match.

On 26 January 2022, Elias Manoel scored two goals in a 2-1 victory over Caxias on matchday 1 of the 2022 Campeonato Gaúcho. A few days later, on 29 January he scored from the penalty spot in a 1-1 draw with Grêmio Esportivo Brasil.
 On 19 March 2022, Elias Manoel opened the scoring for Gremio in a 3-0 victory over Internacional in the opening leg of the Campeonato Gaúcho semi-finals. On 27 April 2022, Elias Manoel scored his first goal in Série B, the loan goal in a 1-0 victory over Operário. A few days later, on 30 April 2022, Elias Manoel opened the scoring for Gremio in a 2-0 victory over Clube de Regatas Brasil.

Elias Manoel was the top goalscorer during the 2022 Campeonato Gaúcho, scoring 5 goals in 11 matches to help lead Gremio to the title. The young Brazilian ended the 2022 season as Grêmio's second leading scorer behind former Brazilian international Diego Souza, scoring 7 goals in 30 matches.

Loan to New York Red Bulls
During August 2022 Elias Manoel was loaned to New York Red Bulls until December 2022, with a purchase option included in the contract.  On 31 August 2022, Elias Manoel made his debut for New York, appearing as a starter in a 1-0 victory versus CF Montréal. On 9 October 2022,  Elias Manoel scored his first two goals for New York in a 2-0 victory over Charlotte FC.

New York Red Bulls
Following his loan with the Red Bulls, the club announced on 6 January 2023 that Manoel had signed on a permanent deal.

Career statistics

Club

Honours
Grêmio
Campeonato Gaúcho: 2021, 2022
Recopa Gaúcha: 2021, 2022

References

External links

Profile at the Grêmio F.B.P.A. website

2001 births
Living people
Brazilian footballers
Association football wingers
Association football forwards
Campeonato Brasileiro Série A players
Campeonato Brasileiro Série B players
Grêmio Foot-Ball Porto Alegrense players
Sportspeople from Campinas
New York Red Bulls players
Major League Soccer players